Oostbuurt is a hamlet in the Dutch province of South Holland. It is a part of the municipality of Westland, and lies about 6 km north of Maassluis.

The statistical area "Oostbuurt", which also can include the surrounding countryside, has a population of around 150.

References

Populated places in South Holland
Westland (municipality), Netherlands